Gallows Corner is a major road junction in Romford in Greater London, England. It was the site of the gallows of the Liberty of Havering, hence the name.

History

During the 18th century, Gallows Corner was a copse-sided part of the road and, approachable by meagre path only from the south or various small lanes in other directions, a favourite spot for waylaying coaches. It was close to the site for the gallows, thought to be north of what is now Eastern Avenue (west), on a grassy stretch below Masefield Crescent.  Several entries in the Romford registers of burials of felons confirm many of those executed there in the 16th and 17th centuries. In grounds of Ravensbourne School is where the small jail stood where the condemned were held.

The former name of Straight Road was Gallows Lane.

Junction
The current junction is a large roundabout with five exits and a flyover. The exits are:

Westbound: A12 (Eastern Avenue), towards central London.
South-westbound: A118 (Main Road), towards Romford.
South-eastbound: A127 (Southend Arterial Road), towards Southend-on-Sea.
North-eastbound: A12 (Colchester Road), towards East Anglia.
Northbound: Straight Road, a minor road towards Harold Hill.

Flyover
The flyover links Eastern Avenue (East) with the Southend Arterial Road. According to the Romford Recorder it was erected in 1970 by Terry and Co; it takes the form of a system of prefabricated units (called the Braithwaite FliWay) that was cheaper and quicker to build than a conventional underpass or cast in-situ flyover. It is notorious for being angular, with sudden changes of slope rather than a smooth arch. The flyover was closed for several months in 2008 for remedial work carried out to the road deck, with several sections replaced. It was found in final inspection that the bridge parapets had suffered severe corrosion. The bridge was fitted with emergency barriers which meant that traffic was restricted to one lane in the London-bound (westbound) direction only. It  re-opened to two-way traffic in 2009.

Roundabout
The junction has an above-average number of collisions. Transport for London has put forward proposals to make the junction safer by changing the roundabout layout, adding new white lines and guidance markings, and extending the reduced speed limits on the approaches to the junction. Works were expected to start during spring 2018.

Works did not, however, commence in 2018; the local radio station Time 107.5 reported in July 2021 that TfL was planning to submit a bid to the Department of Transport in Spring 2022 to access £50m of Government funding to address the issues with the junction.

In media
The junction is referred to in the film Layer Cake.

References

Districts of the London Borough of Havering
Areas of London
Road junctions in London
Roundabouts in England
Romford